100 dni do matury (English: 100 days to matura) is the debut studio album by Polish rapper Mata. It was released on 18 January 2020 by the SBM Label music label. The album debuted at No. 1 on the Polish OLiS sales list, later achieving quadruple platinum, and diamond in June 2022.

The album was the most listened to album by a Polish artist on the streaming platform Spotify in 2020 and 5th in 2021, and the 10th most purchased album in Poland in 2020 and 27th in 2021.

Reception 
The album was described by reviewers as "a decent disc, with really good moments".

Music reviewers noted Mata's self-irony present in the lyrics, his "linguistic prowess", his "maturity in thinking about language", his "studious, at times demonstrably naive perspective", his "observational skills and naive sensitivity to the surrounding world", and his "good technique and wide interests, which can be heard in the backing tracks, stretched widely between the old and new schools of hip-hop". They pointed to Taco Hemingway's noticeable influence on the album.

Track listing

Awards and nominations

Charts

References 

2020 albums
Mata (rapper) albums
Polish-language albums